Irumban is 2023 Indian Tamil-language Drama film written and directed by V Keera, and produced by Tamil Bala and R.Vinothkumar under, Lemuria Movies. It features Junior MGR, Aishwarya Dutta, Yogi Babu in the lead roles with Shaji Choudhary, Sendrayan, Raksitha, Aswini, Manimaran, Sampath Ram, Kayal Devaraj playing the pivotal roles. The film was released 10 March 2023 in theatres.

Cast

Production 
The First look and Motion poster of the film was released by actor Vijay Sethupathi on 9 July 2022. Some scenes of the film were shot in the middle of the sea in the Andaman and Nicobar Islands. Irumban Audio launch took place on 7 January 2023 and the trailer was released on that day.

Reception 
The film was released 10 March 2023 in theatres. A critic from Dina Thanthi gave mixture of review and noted that "Cinematographer Lenin Balaji has brilliantly captured the beauty of the Mediterranean and the forest. Listen to 'Nanga Pudusa Kattikita Jodi' Remix song composed by Srikanth Deva. The background music also makes the story move faster. The slackness in the second half of the screenplay is a weakness for the film. Director Keera has shot a different love story briskly.".A critic from Thinaboomi said that " Kudos to Lenin Balaji for the beautiful cinematography of the sea and storm scenes. Director Keera has tried to give it as an adventure thriller with love" Critic from Maalai Malar gave a mixture of reviews and noted that " Director Keera has conveyed the true story beautifully to the audience. The slackness in the second half of the screenplay is a weakness of the film. The unusual love story has been beautifully shot and is being appreciated."

References

External links 

 

Indian action drama films
2020s Tamil-language films